The Gallows Pole is an upcoming six-part television series made for the BBC by Element Pictures, Big Arty Productions, and A24. It is a Shane Meadows adaptation of the novel of the same name by Benjamin Myers.

Synopsis
The series tells true story of the rise and fall of David Hartley and the Cragg Vale Coiners at the onset of the industrial revolution in 18th century Yorkshire. Hartley (Socha) assembles a gang of weavers and land-workers to embark upon a revolutionary criminal enterprise that will capsize the economy and become the biggest fraud in British history.

Cast
 Michael Socha
 Thomas Turgoose
 George MacKay
 Tom Burke
 Sophie McShera
 Cara Theobold
 Yusra Warsama
 Eve Burley
 Nicole Barber Lane
 Samuel Edward-Cook
 Anthony Welsh
 Joe Sproulle
 Adam Fogerty
 Fine Time Fontayne

Producion
The project was announced for Meadows in May 2021 as his first television series with executive producers Piers Wenger and Tom Lazenby for the BBC. The series is being produced for the BBC by Element Pictures with A24.

Casting
In September 2021 Socha, Burke, Turgoose and McKay were confirmed in the cast. Meadows described going on an "open casting odyssey, watching over 6,500 self-tapes from unrepresented actors and actresses".

Filming
Principal photography was revealed to have started in September 2021. Filming locations included the village of Heptonstall, near Hebden Bridge in Yorkshire.

Broadcast
In December 2022, the BBC confirmed the series would be broadcast in 2023.

References

External links

Upcoming television series
2023 British television series debuts
2020s British crime television series
BBC crime drama television shows
British crime television series
Television series set in the 18th century